Love Aur Rajneeti is an Indian Bhojpuri-language action film directed by Harsh Anand and produced by Asha Devi through "Orio Media Pvt Ltd".

Ravi Kishan and Anjana Singh are in lead roles. and Awadhesh Mishra, Brijesh Tripathi and Manoj Pandit in supporting roles.

The Music of the film was released by SRK Media Entertainment in 2015.

Anjana Singh and Ravi Kishan had worked together previously.  She made her debut opposite Ravi Kishan in 'Foulaad' in 2011.

In Love Aur Rajneeti, Anjana is seen playing the role of a politician in the film.. The story depicts her struggle from a poor and humble beginning to a rising political star destined to fulfill the dreams of her people.

The film has been a major boxoffice hit and had a bumper opening, The film released on 15 January 2016.

Cast
Ravi Kishan
Anjana Singh
Brijesh Tripathi

Soundtrack
The soundtrack for Love Aur Rajneeti was composed by Lovely Sharma with lyrics written by Akhilesh Pandey. It was produced under the "SRK Music" label.

References

External links
 

2016 films
2010s Bhojpuri-language films
Indian action drama films
2016 action drama films
Indian political drama films
2010s political drama films